Aorere College is a New Zealand co-educational state secondary school (Years 9–13) that was established in 1964 in the Auckland suburb of Papatoetoe. The current principal of the college is Leanne Webb.

History 
Aorere College was founded in 1964 under the tentative name Papatoetoe West Post Primary School, to serve Mangere East and Papatoetoe West, and to ease overcrowding at Papatoetoe High School. The founding principal, Charles Herbert, decided on a new name and the school was renamed Aorere College in 1965. The name is a portmanteau of the Māori words Ao (clouds or sky) and Rere (to fly), indicating the school's vision for its students "to rise up and climb to the greatest heights in every aspect of their learning and achievements". It also reflected the school's proximity to Auckland Airport.

In 2015, Aorere College was put on a 4–5 year Education Review Office cycle due to the school's high level of administrative and academic offerings.

Facilities 
Like many New Zealand secondary schools built in the 1960s, Aorere College was constructed to the Nelson Two-Storey standard plan, distinguished by its two-storey H-shaped classroom blocks. Subsequently, new buildings have been added to accommodate increased student numbers. Developments include a second gymnasium, the Colin Pascoe Gymnasium opened in 2010 and named after the school's second principal, and remodelling of and extension to the hard technology facility in 2018.

The school now has 1GB Wi-Fi across the campus, five computer labs, and approximately 1200 Chromebooks. All students have access to the G Suite for Education learning ecosystem.

Notable alumni 

 Donna Rose Addis – professor of Neuropsychology, University of Toronto
 Gary Troup – New Zealand cricket, Former deputy mayor of Manukau City
 Andrew John Pullan – applied mathematician, professor of Engineering, University of Auckland
 Keven Mealamu – retired rugby union player, All Blacks and Blues 
 Pene and Amitai Pati – members of the operatic pop trio Sol3 Mio
 Lorna Suafoa – ex Silver Ferns netball player
 Marata Niukore – current NRL player, Parramatta Eels
 Dei Hamo – hip hop artist
 Mark Hunt – World K1 Kickboxing champion and UFC fighter

See also
List of schools in the Auckland Region

References

Secondary schools in Auckland
Educational institutions established in 1964
1964 establishments in New Zealand
Ōtara-Papatoetoe Local Board Area